Eidgah or Kheri Eidgah is a mosque and Eidgah near the railway tracks between Lakhimpur and Kheri.

Construction 
The foundation of the historic Eidgah was laid in North West of Kheri Town, outside the dwelling area.

Architecture 
The courtyard of the mosque can be reached from entrances on three sides. On the day of Eid, the area outside mosque is used for food stalls, shops and by street entertainers.

See also 

Eidgah
Islamic architecture

Notes

External links 

Flickr: Photos tagged with "Eidgah Kheri"

Mosques in Uttar Pradesh
Tourist attractions in Lakhimpur Kheri district
Eidgahs